The Monsters & Strangerz are an American production and songwriting team from Miami, Florida. The team features The Monsters: Alexander "Eskeerdo" Izquierdo, Stefan Johnson, Jordan K. Johnson and Oliver "German" Peterhof and The Strangerz: SDHARU, Marcus "Marc Lo" Lomax and Clarence Coffee Jr.

In 2011, The Monsters & Strangerz moved their operation to Los Angeles and have produced and written for artists including Maroon 5, Camila Cabello, Halsey, Zedd, Rihanna, Nick Jonas, Liam Payne, Katy Perry, Selena Gomez, Pitbull, Jennifer Lopez, Britney Spears, Dua Lipa, Demi Lovato, Jason Derulo, Fifth Harmony, Kanye West, Big Sean, Bebe Rexha, and many others.

History
The Monsters originated as a team in 2008, when Stefan Johnson began to engineer for Miami artist and songwriter Alexander "Eskeerdo" Izquierdo. At the time Johnson was an in-demand engineer working with major artists like Rick Ross, Pitbull, and Diddy. Shortly after meeting Eskeerdo and Johnson along with his brother and producer Jordan Johnson formed The Monsters.

The Strangerz met through a mutual friend in high school in early 2005. Marcus "MarcLo" Lomax is the son of a pastor and a multi-instrumentalist; he began his musical career in his father's church band. Clarence Coffee Jr. is the son of a gospel singer; he grew up perfecting his vocals and melodies after being inspired by his family's passion for music.

The Monsters & Strangerz were introduced to each other in late 2010.

The group frequently collaborates on songwriting and production with American singer-songwriter, rapper and producer Jon Bellion, who they started working with in 2018.

Discography

Production and songwriting credits

Songwriting credits

Top 10 Singles

References

Songwriters from Florida
2009 establishments in Florida